United Nations Security Council resolution 806, adopted unanimously on 5 February 1993, after recalling resolutions 687 (1991), 689 (1991) and 773 (1992) in addition to a report by the Secretary-General Boutros Boutros-Ghali, the council, acting under Chapter VII of the United Nations Charter, guaranteed the inviolability of the international boundary between Iraq and Kuwait measures taken to enforce it, in the aftermath of Iraqi incursions into the demilitarised zone in January 1993.

The resolution then requested the secretary-general to plan for a strengthening of the United Nations Iraq–Kuwait Observation Mission (UNIKOM) and execute a phased deployment of personnel. Under this provision, UNIKOM would be converted into an armed force, with a 908-member Bengali infantry battalion supplementing the observer group. At the same time, it granted UNIKOM the power to prevent violations in the demilitarised zone.

The Council concluded by reaffirming that the next review of developments relating to UNIKOM would take place in April 1993.

See also
 Gulf War
 Invasion of Kuwait
 Kuwait–Iraq barrier
 List of United Nations Security Council Resolutions 801 to 900 (1993–1994)

References

External links
 
Text of the Resolution at undocs.org

 0806
 0806
1993 in Iraq
Iraq and weapons of mass destruction
 0806
February 1993 events